The 2018–19 season was Pafos's 5th year in existence, and second season in the Cypriot First Division.

Season review
In June, Pafos announced the signings of former Dundee defender Kevin Holt, and Evgenios Petrou from Ethnikos Assia.

In July, Pafos sign goalkeeper Joël Mall, defenders Lorran, Andreas Panayiotou, Radek Dejmek and Henrique, and midfielders Jens Cools and Zdeněk Folprecht.

In August, Matija Širok, Lulinha, Kostas Giannoulis, Federico Rasic, Diego Živulić, Pavel Lelyukhin and Adam Nemec all signed for Pafos. Whilst Andreas Karo and Luca Polizzi joined on loan from Apollon Limassol for the season, Patrick Banggaard from Darmstadt 98 and Brayan Angulo from América de Cali on similar loan deals.

Pafos finished off their summer signings in September by signing Simo Choukoud, Jander from Apollon Limassol and Giannis Angelopoulos from Olympiacos.

On 11 December, Deniss Rakels returned to Pafos following his loan spell at Riga.

On 22 January, Radek Dejmek left Pafos to join GKS Katowice.

On 1 February, Pafos announced the signing of Abdisalam Ibrahim after he'd left Vålerenga, and the signing of Artūrs Karašausks from FK RFS.

On 26 February, Kévin Bérigaud was sent on loan to Riga.

Transfers

In

Loans in

Out

Loans out

Released

Squad

Out on loan

Left club during season

Friendlies

Competitions

Overview

Cyta Championship

Regular season

League table

Results summary

Results by results

Results

Relegation round

League table

Results summary

Results by results

Results

Cypriot Cup

Squad statistics

Appearances and goals

|-
|colspan="14"|Players away on loan:

|-
|colspan="14"|Players who appeared for Pafos but left during the season:

|}

Goal scorers

Clean sheets

Disciplinary record

References

Pafos FC seasons
Pafos FC season